"E.S.P." is the sixth episode aired of the first series of UFO - a 1970 British television science fiction series about an alien invasion of Earth. Alan Fennell wrote the screenplay and it was directed by Ken Turner. The episode was filmed between 23 October and 4 November 1969 and aired on the ATV Midlands network on 21 October 1970. Though shown as the sixth episode, it was actually the fifteenth to have been filmed.

The series was created by Gerry Anderson and Sylvia Anderson with Reg Hill, and produced by the Andersons and Lew Grade's Century 21 Productions for Grade's ITC Entertainment company.

Story
Returning home after seeing his psychiatrist, John Croxley, a man with very powerful ESP, is stopped by SHADO personnel due to an incoming UFO. The UFO crashes into Croxley's house killing his wife and injuring Col. Foster who was monitoring the UFO from a SHADO mobile.

Foster is taken to hospital and SHADO sends a team to investigate the crash site. Croxley, now under alien influence, is able to read the minds of the SHADO team and learns all about SHADO's operations. Croxley believes that Straker and Freeman caused his wife's death and sets out to kill them.

Foster believes that someone or something is watching him – a response to his mind being read by Croxley. Croxley sends Straker what looks like a film script but is instead a full, detailed description of SHADO's organisation and its operations, including places and times. After visiting Croxley's psychiatrist, Straker and Freeman learn of Croxley's ESP ability and are told to meet Croxley at his ruined house where Croxley, still under alien influence, intends to kill them both.

Foster, who has been told that revisiting the site of his injuries will help his recuperation, also arrives at the house. Although Croxley's ability allows him to be aware of Foster's presence he does not stop Foster, who shoots Croxley just as he is about to kill Straker and Freeman.

Cast

Starring
 Ed Bishop — Commander Edward Straker
 George Sewell — Col. Alec E. Freeman
 Gabrielle Drake — Lt. Gay Ellis
 Dolores Mantez — Lt. Nina Barry
 Keith Alexander — Lt. Keith Ford
 Norma Ronald — Miss Ealand
 Harry Baird — Lt. Mark Bradley

Also starring
 John Stratton — John Croxley

Featuring
 Douglas Wilmer — Dr. Brünner	
 Deborah Stanford — Stella Croxley	
 Maxwell Shaw — Dr. Shroeder	
 Stanley McGeogh — SHADO guard	
 Donald Tandy — Gate security

Production notes
Locations included Sara Lee Factory, Slough; Neptune House at ATV Elstree Studios, Borehamwood; and MGM-British Studios, Borehamwood.

References

External links

1970 British television episodes
UFO (TV series) episodes